Tera Mera Rishta is a 2015 Pakistani drama serial written by Rabia Razzaq and directed by Ali Faizan Anchan. It starred model Shahzad Noor, Farwa Kazmi and Abdullah Ejaz in lead roles. The series marked the debut of model Shahzad Noor.

Plot

As the families of Hoorain and Haider come together for their union, Hoorain's brother is murdered leaving everyone devastated and disturbed. Will they ever be able to bring the murderer to justice and overcome this tragedy?

Cast
Shahzad Noor as Maiz
Farwa Kazmi as Hoorain
Abdullah Ejaz as Haider; fiancé of Hoorain and her childhood friend
Tauqeer Nasir as Hashim Sarkar; well established business man and father of Maiz
Naila Jaffri as Muraad's mother
Sehrish Khan as Aliya; Zulfi and Hoorain's mother
Alamdar Khan as Muraad
Sanad Humayun as Tanzeela
Nabeel Shahid as Zulfi; younger brother of Hoorain 
Marjan Fatima as Marjan

Broadcast and release
The serial premiered on Geo Entertainment airing episodes twice a week (Friday and Saturday) at prime time, from 11 December 2015. It was also aired on Geo Kahani.

Since 20 April 2020, It is available for streaming on Amazon Prime with 4.5 stars rating.

References

2016 Pakistani television seasons
Geo TV original programming